Fatema Chowdhury Paru (August 4, 1944 – Unknown) was a politician from Sylhet district in Bangladesh who was a Member of Parliament for the reserved 24-seat constituency.

Early life 
Paru was born on 4 August 1944 in Rankeli village of Golapganj Upazila, Sylhet District, East Bengal, British India. She was the first daughter of the late Abdul Hamid Hamdu Miah. In 1973, she passed HSC from Sylhet Government Women's College. Her brother Yamin Chowdhury received the title of Bir Bikram.

Career 
Paru was a Member of Parliament nominated by the Bangladesh Nationalist Party from the women's seat 24 of the Second, Fifth and Sixth Jatiya Sangsad. She has died.

তথ্যসূত্র 

6th Jatiya Sangsad members
5th Jatiya Sangsad members
2nd Jatiya Sangsad members
Bangladesh Nationalist Party politicians
People of the Bangladesh Liberation War
2002 deaths
1944 births
People from Golapganj Upazila
Women members of the Jatiya Sangsad
20th-century Bangladeshi women politicians